KCDZ (107.7 FM) is a radio station broadcasting a Hot Adult Contemporary format. Z107.7, licensed to Twentynine Palms, California, United States, the station serves the Twentynine Palms area.  The station is currently owned by Morongo Basin Broadcasting Corporation, has been in operation for twenty five years, and features programming from ABC Radio. Located in the Victor Valley market, ranked by arbitron as #114 in total population includes Twentynine Palms, Yucca Valley, Joshua Tree, and San Bernardino county.

The station was launched in Joshua Tree in 1989, and is celebrating twenty-five years of continued service to its community. Owned by Cindy & Gary Daigneault, who operate as General Manager and News Director respectively.

The station features the "Z107.7 Morning Show", hosted by Gary Daigneault and Cody Joseph. The show runs from 6am to 10am Monday through Friday, and is the most listened to program on the station. The morning show provides daily news, games and contests, and frequent guest appearances.

Z107.7 is best known for its award-winning local news, which airs seven times a day, seven days a week. Reporters include Managing Editor Tami Roleff, Mike Lipsitz, Rebecca Havely, Eric Knabe, and David Haldane, who is also the weekend news anchor.

Other personalities include Cody Joseph, Jessica Aponte weekdays and Andrew Dielemen & Keith Bailey weekends.

The stations official website is located at z1077fm.com

Awards 
In 2010, Z107.7 News Director Gary Daigneault was selected for induction into the Associated Press Television-Radio Association, or APTRA, Hall of Fame.  In a remarkable career high point the Associated Press said Daigneault was selected for his work as News director, and co-owner of KCDZ for the past two decades.  He’s been honored by APTRA numerous times for his reporting, as well as having been two-time APTRA President, and long-time board member. In his 42-year career, Daigneault has won a wide variety of broadcast journalism accolades, including "Best Editorial", "Best Newscast" and the "Station of the Year" 2002. in 2008, Daigneault won a Golden Mike Award for "Best Newscast Writing".

In 2012, managing editor Tami Roleff won a Golden Mike Award for Z107.7 from the Radio and Television News Association for her August 2011 story about a man who survived being lost in the desert for nine days.

In 2018, reporter and weekend news anchor David Haldane won a Golden Mike Award from the Radio and Television News Association for his June 2018 feature on efforts by local firefighters to help special needs children play baseball for Yucca Valley's Miracle League.

The Z107.7 Local News has been nominated for the Golden Mike Award by the Radio Television News Association of Southern California for "Best Small Market Newscast under 15 Minutes" three times, the latest in 2018 and 2019.

The National Association of Broadcasters named Z107.7 a finalist for the Crystal Award for Community Service twice and twice for The Marconi Awards AC Station of the Year.

Radio Ink, the radio industry’s management and marketing publication recognized Z107.7 with several awards including two times as Best Small Market Program Director in America and the Top 10 Small Market General Manager Award.

Z107.7 has also received the prestigious “Good Neighbor” award from the American Red Cross for its involvement during the Landers
earthquake.

Community service 
Z107.7 has been involved in many community events including Fourth of July fireworks shows, local parades, the Summer Concert Series, street fairs, Grubstake Days, Toys for Tots drives with the US Marine Corps and a variety of charity fundraisers. The staff are also involved with Rotary Club, the Chambers of Commerce, and Theater 29. In times of local emergencies, such as the 1992 Landers earthquake and the 2006 Sawtooth Fire, Z107.7 converts to a 24-hour news update format, providing the information and news local residents need.

Past Personalities 

Pat Michaels previously operated as the station's Program Director until 2007, when he exited the station to join KAFF-FM 92.9 in Flagstaff, AZ. Michaels also performed as the co-host of the "Z107.7 Morning Show." After premiering as the PM drive personality, Michaels became the sole host of the "Morning Moo" on KAFF-FM. In November 2012, Michaels returned to Z107.7. Michaels originally started with the station as a teenager, working as the evening air talent, later exiting for a position with Mediabase Music Research, and then returning to the morning show. While acting as the Program Director of Z107.7, Pat Michaels geared the station from a soft Adult Contemporary station and turned to a more modern HOT AC format. Pat also hosts "The Local Music Showcase" Sunday's between 4 and 5 PM featuring local music artists from Joshua Tree and surrounding communities. Local musicians are invited to submit music for airplay. Visit the station website for more information.

Other past personalities

 Vikki Gardner
 Gary Niren
 Les Taylor

References

External links

CDZ
Twentynine Palms, California